Dong Chengpeng (born January 2, 1982), known professionally as Da Peng, is a Chinese actor, director, scriptwriter, presenter, and singer.

Dong Chengpeng began his career in 2004 as the host of a stars interview program called "INSTAR". He has also hosted Da Peng Talk Show. He started acting in 2008 in the movie Perfect Bride. and was a supporting actor in the series Crazy Office, for which he wrote the theme song "Not a Passer-By".  He has also directed, first in a short comedy Diors Man, then the movie Jian Bing Man which won 'The Best 12th 'China Movie Channel Media Award', and he was awarded Best New Director and Best New Actor. The same year he won Chinese American Talents Exchange Outstanding Teenager Director Award in the 11th 'Chinese American Film Festival'. He also directed and performed the film City of Rock. He was nominated 'Best Supporting Actor' of the 11th 'The Asian Film Awards' for his role in I Am Not Madame Bovary.

Early life
Dong Chengpeng was born in Ji'an, Jilin on January 2, 1982. He graduated from Faculty of Management, Jilin Jianzhu University, majoring in Engineering Management.

Career 
In May 2004, he worked as the host of the stars interview program 'INSTAR.' That was what started his host career.

In 2006, he hosted and produced two entertainment programs 'Entertainment Today' and 'Music N Me'. In August, worked as sub-editor of 'Souhu Entertainment Broadcast'. In December, published his single "Autumn is the Breakup Season".

In 2007, he hosted the talk show Da Peng Talk Show. In July, he was the hero called Jia Dao in the drama My Name Is Fame. In August, he joined the music recording of 'We are ready', and took part in the Olympics one year countdown performance.

In 2008, he was one of the leading actors of Perfect Bride acted with Keyu Guo and Zhang He. The supporting actor was a shy man called Luo Jie and was the first movie he took part in. In December, he was the leading actor in the drama Ideal Couple.

In January 2009, he worked with Huang Bo, Du Haitao, Zhang Dianfei as the leading actors of the film Radish Warrior, Stubborn Robot. On February 14, he joined the love story film Contract about Status Interchange. In May, he hosted an entertainment information program from Sohu called 'Songs Be Unfit for My Halls' with Aya. In June, he worked as host of the entertainment program 'Bickering' produced by Shandong TV. In December, he hosted a Peasant-Workers' Startup Helping program 'Sunny Road' of CCTV-7.

In January 2010, he hosted a variety show Yīchù Jífā produced by Travel Channel and took part in the movie Ocean Heaven with Xue Xiaolu. In March, he worked as a host in the variety show Stars Turn Around from Liaoning Channel. In April, he apprenticed with Zhao Benshan, becoming the 55th student of Zhao.

In January 2011, he played a robber called Xiao Cui in the drama The Breakup Guru with Cao Yunjin, Dai Lele, and Liang Chao. In February, he hosted Comedy World produced by Beijing Channel. Then, acting as leading roles along with Dai Jun, Xia Fan, Meng Xi, he was in the comedy Crazy Office and wrote the theme song "Not a Passer-By".

In 2012, he directed the mini comedy Diors Man, worked as the scriptwriter, and was its leading actor. In July, he hosted a press proof program 'News and science' produced by Hunan TV. In the same year, he joined the show Your Face Sounds Familiar, and became its champion.

In 2013, he directed and wrote the mini comedy sequel Diors Man 2. He was also the leading actor. He then published the book Laugh Out Loud in the Tough Days.

On January 11, 2014, he was the leading actor of Hello Babies. In the movie, he was the brother of actress Lynn Hung. Later, he joined the CCTV New Year's Gala to performed a skit Disturbing with Cai Ming, Hua Shao, Yue Yunpeng. In February, he directed the mini comedy Diors Man 3, worked as the scriptwriter, and was the leading actor.

On February 6, 2015, he worked as the leading actor in movie Crazy New Year's Eve. In the movie, he was an arrogant rich man called Shen Dabao. Later that year, he joined the skit I Do at the Spring Festival Gala produced by Changchun Province. The same year, he was the director of the mini comedy Diors Man 4. He worked as the scriptwriter and was the leading actor in it. On June 20, his self-directed and self-performed movie Jian Bing Man won 'The Best 12th 'China Movie Channel Media Award', and he was given 'Best New Director', and 'Best New Actor' awards.

Also in 2015, he won two Golden Angels for "Most Outstanding Young Director" and "Most Popular Actor" at the 11th Chinese American Film Festival in Los Angeles. He sang the two theme songs 'Jian Bing Man' and 'Bird Fear of Heights'. He joined the reality show Masked King. On December 4, he joined a sci-fi comedy Impossible, and played a greedy gangdom man.

In 2016, he played a great talent man called Zhuge Qingyun as one of the leading actors among Ni Ni, Aarif Rahman and Zhou Dongyu of the film The Thousand Faces of Dunjia. Then, he was the actor of Feng Xiaogang's movie I Am Not Madame Bovary. On May 8, Jian Bing Man got the best maiden work of 23rd Beijing College Student Film Festival. In the same year, he worked as a producer and leading actor of the movie Father and Son. In October, he sang the theme song 'I Am Not Madame Bovary' with Dee Hsu. 'Sing' was dubbed by him.

In 2017, he played a role in the movie Journey to the West: The Demons Strike Back, and was the exorcism master on screen. On September 29, his self-directed and self-performed movie City of Rock was released, where he was one of the leading actors.

Filmography

Film

Television

Discography

Bibliography

References

External links

DongChengPeng's Weibo 

Living people
1982 births
Chinese television producers
Participants in Chinese reality television series
21st-century Chinese male singers